Iraq was one of the founding members of the United Nations since 21 December 1945 as the Kingdom of Iraq. It signed the Declaration by United Nations in 1943. As a member of the UN, Iraq held a seat as a non-permanent member in the Security Council between 1957-1958 and 1974-1975.

History

See also
Foreign relations of Iraq

References

External links
   Website of the Permanent Mission of the Republic of Iraq to the United Nations
  Republic of Iraq's Ministry of Foreign Affairs website